The 2015 Elon Phoenix football team represented Elon University in the 2015 NCAA Division I FCS football season. They were led by second-year head coach Rich Skrosky and played their home games at Rhodes Stadium. They were second year members of the Colonial Athletic Association (CAA). They finished the season 4–7, 3–5 in CAA play to finish in a four-way tie for seventh place.

Schedule

References

Elon
Elon Phoenix football seasons
Elon Phoenix football